Ellen A. Harley (born December 31, 1946) is a former Republican member of the Pennsylvania House of Representatives.

Background
Born in Nashville, Tennessee on December 31, 1946, Harley earned her Bachelor of Arts degree in English from Monmouth College and her Master of Arts in city and regional planning from The University of Pennsylvania. A city and regional planner, she was elected as a Republican to the Pennsylvania House of Representatives for the 1991 and 1993 terms. 

Appointed to the Pennsylvania Public Television Network Commission for the 1991-1992 term, she was subsequently appointed to the Pennsylvania Council on the Arts for the 1993-1994 term. 

She opted not to stand as a candidate for reelection to the House in 1994, and instead ran an unsuccessful campaign for the United States Congress.

References

Monmouth College alumni
Republican Party members of the Pennsylvania House of Representatives
Women state legislators in Pennsylvania
Living people
1946 births
21st-century American women